Sohail Mahmood is a BPS-22 grade Pakistani diplomat who is serving as the 30th Foreign Secretary of Pakistan. He was appointed to the position in March 2019, succeeding Tehmina Janjua. Previously, he served as the High Commissioner to India.

Career 
Mahmood is a senior diplomat of Pakistan's Foreign Service, and previously served as ambassador to Turkey and Thailand.

References

Ambassadors of Pakistan to Turkey
Ambassadors of Pakistan to Thailand
High Commissioners of Pakistan to India
Living people
Year of birth missing (living people)